Jewish revolt may refer to the following: 
Judas of Galilee uprisings in 4 BCE and 6 CE
Jacob and Simon uprising 46 CE
Jewish–Roman wars 66–135
First Jewish–Roman War 66–73
Kitos War 115–17
Bar Kokhba revolt 132–35
Jewish revolt against Constantius Gallus 351–52
Mar Zutra II revolt in Sasanian Persia 495–502
Jewish revolt against Heraclius 614–17
Jewish insurgency in Mandatory Palestine, 1940s